The Chairman of the General Staff of the Armed Forces (abbreviated COGS) also known as the "Chief of the General Staff" is the chief and highest ranking officer of the Saudi Arabian Armed Forces.

He usually holds the highest military rank within the Ministry of Defense. The current Chairman is Air Chief Marshal Fayyadh al-Ruwaili, who succeeded General Abdulrahman al-Bunian in February 2018.

List of chairmen

See also

 General Staff Presidency

References

External links
 MoD (official website)

General Staff Presidency
Military chiefs of staff
Armed Forces of Saudi Arabia
Staff (military)
Saudi
1939 establishments in Saudi Arabia